FK Lokomotyvas Radviliškis was a Lithuanian football team from Radviliškis. The team played in the Lithuanian Football Cup and I Lyga.

Current squad

References

Loko
2012 establishments in Lithuania
Association football clubs established in 2012